Marc Douton is a French rally raid driver. He won the 2021 Dakar Rally in the classic category, winning 6 stages in the process. He was the first competitor to win the Dakar Rally in the classic category.

Career results

Rally Dakar results

References

Date of birth missing (living people)
Living people
Place of birth missing (living people)
French rally drivers
Dakar Rally drivers
Dakar Rally winning drivers
Year of birth missing (living people)
21st-century French people